"Que Calor" is a song recorded by American electronic dance music trio Major Lazer featuring Colombian singer J Balvin and Dominican rapper El Alfa. It was released on September 11, 2019, through Diplo's label Mad Decent. It is the second single from Major Lazer's fourth studio album Music Is the Weapon, which was released in 2020. This also marks the second collaboration between Major Lazer and J Balvin, after "Buscando Huellas" in 2017. The artists also released a lyric translation of the track in English.

Background 
One week before, Major Lazer announced the date of the release and posted a snippet of the track on social networks. They also said to Billboard, "J Balvin and El Alfa both are two of the most exciting artists currently working to us, and artists that we have longstanding relationships with. We've collaborated with Latin artists from the very beginning of Major Lazer -- I think many Americans forget how much of the Caribbean is Spanish-speaking, and that's a huge part of our influences. There's so much energy in Latin music right now and we love helping bring it back home." Diplo said too, "Sorry I was late on the song of the summer." The song is part of the FIFA 20 game soundtrack and in the "Volta Football" new mode. The official soundtrack of FIFA 20 was also released via Spotify, Apple, and Deezer on September 13.

Indian rapper Badshah released an official remix of the song on November 15, 2019. On this occasion, he said, "It is a huge pleasure for me to be on the 'Que calor' India Remix. I loved the track the moment I heard it. Major Lazer are dance music legends, I have worked with them in the past and I truly believe they have a major role in shaping the current global sound. J Balvin is a rockstar whom I really look up to and I think El Alfa has done an extraordinary job. It gives me honour and pleasure to be collaborating with these stars and bring Que calor to India." Major Lazer added, "We just dropped an official remix of Que Calor with Badshah, who brings serious heat. India holds a special place in our hearts and our Indian fans have given so much love back to us to our songs, so it was time for us to give something special to them." A week later, on November 22, 2019, the track was also remixed by California rapper Saweetie.

Critical reception 
Kat Bein from Billboard described the song as "a steamy banger for peak club hours". Writing for Dancing Astronaut, Farrell Sweeney called it a feel-good song. According to him, it's the perfect trigger to get the listener dancing. In parallel, Brian Bonavoglia from DJ Times noted the track as a robust dancefloor anthem with summertime vibes alive. Katie Stone from EDM.com said that "Que Calor" is a vibrant track and a melding of cultures with a dancehall-dembow rhythm that looks like El Alfa style. In the same way, Mike Wass from Idolator called the song "a rump-shaking floorfiller with enough hooks to demolish the language barrier." The flute at the beginning of the track was seen as a cover of 1993 Colombian cumbia classic "Curura" by the Afro-Colombian group Totó la Momposina with modern pop influences. Keely Quinlan from Stereogum described the song as "an oriental-sounding flute plays, an infectious central melody, underscored by a speedy, tinny rhythm section".

Music videos 
The official music video of the song was released at the same day through Major Lazer's YouTube channel. The music video was directed by the VMA and BET Award-winning Colin Tilley, who  worked on videos of "Alright" by Kendrick Lamar, "Mask Off" by Future and "Anaconda" by Nicki Minaj. It was produced by Jamee Ranta and Jack Winter, and orchestrated by choreographer Calvit Hodge. There are girls dancers  around the artists, in a dark atmosphere, like in the clip of "Lean On". The girls in the clip are Major Lazer usual dancers, the Lazer Gyals, Sara Bivens and Helen Gedlu. The video sees Diplo in a cow-print getup complete with a printed cowboy hat, around flames, while J Balvin and El Alfa spit fire. Farrell Sweeney from Dancing Astronaut also noted the dynamic visual accompaniment to the dance-worthy single.

On October 3, 2019, Major Lazer posted on their YouTube channel an official dance video directed by Calvit Hodge. Then, on November 1, 2019, J Balvin released through his YouTube channel a dance video compilation. To implement this third clip, the artists asked their fans to give videos showing them dancing on the song. Then, a compilation of their movements was made, accompanied by many dancers and including appearances from American rapper and songwriter Lil Pump, America's Got Talent's Kid The Wiz and Youtuber Lele Pons.

Commercial performance 
In the week ending September 19, the song made a 487% gain in sales in the United States in its first full tracking week as it sold 4,000 downloads, according to Nielsen Music. Two weeks after the release, it climbed to number one on the US Latin Digital Songs chart, peaked at number 20 on the US Latin Streaming Songs chart, and at number 13 on the US Hot Latin Songs chart. This single also marks the first time that Major Lazer joins the list of seventeen DJs who have entered Latin Digital Song Sales in 2019.

Track listing

Credits and personnel 
Credits adapted from Tidal.

 Andre Murilo da Silva – production, composition, lyrics
 Jose Henrique Castanho de Godoy – production, composition, lyrics
 Thomas Pentz – production, composition, lyrics
 Wissem Larfaoui – production, composition, lyrics
 Alejandro Ramírez – composition, lyrics
 Antonio Fernandez – composition, lyrics
 Emmanuel Herrera Batista – composition, lyrics
 José Álvaro Osorio Balvín – composition, lyrics
 Pinheiro – composition, lyrics
 Sonia Bazanta – composition, lyrics
 Tyshane Thompson – composition, lyrics

Charts

Weekly charts

Year-end charts

Certifications

References

External links 
 

Latin music songs
2019 songs
2019 singles
Spanish-language songs
Major Lazer songs
J Balvin songs
Songs written by J Balvin
Songs written by Diplo
Song recordings produced by Diplo
Music videos directed by Colin Tilley
El Alfa songs